Eupithecia immodica is a moth in the  family Geometridae. It is found in the Democratic Republic of Congo.

References

Moths described in 1926
immodica
Moths of Africa